Temple of Hercules is a historic site in the Amman Citadel in Amman, Jordan. It is thought to be the most significant Roman structure in the Amman Citadel. According to an inscription the temple was built when Geminius Marcianus was governor of the Province of Arabia (AD 162–166), in the same period as the Roman Theater in Amman.

Description
 
The portico has six columns ca.  tall. Archaeologists believe that since there are no remains of additional columns the temple was probably not finished, and the marble used to build the Byzantine Church nearby.

Colossal statue

It was probably destroyed in an earthquake. All that remains are three fingers and an elbow.

See also
List of Ancient Roman temples

References 

Buildings and structures in Amman
Amman
Amman
Tourist attractions in Amman
Amman
Temples of Heracles
Ancient Greek and Roman colossal statues